The 2012 FIBA Europe Under-20 Championship was the 15th edition of the FIBA Europe Under-20 Championship. 16 teams featured in the competition, held in Slovenia from 12 to 22 July 2012. Lithuania won the title for the second time.

Participating teams
  (Runners-up, 2011 FIBA Europe Under-20 Championship Division B)

  (Winners, 2011 FIBA Europe Under-20 Championship Division B)

Group stage

First round
In this round, the sixteen teams were allocated in four groups of four teams each. The top three advanced to the Qualifying Round. The last team of each group played for the 13th–16th place in the Classification Games.

Times given below are in CEST (UTC+2).

Group A

Group B

Group C

Group D

Second round
The twelve teams remaining will be allocated in two groups of six teams each. The four top teams will advance to the quarterfinals. The last two teams of each group will play for the 9th–12th place.

Group E

Group F

Classification round
The last teams of each group in the First Round will compete in this Classification Round.

Group G

Knockout round

Championship

Quarterfinals

Semifinals

Bronze-medal game

Final

5th–8th playoffs

Classification 5–8

7th-place game

5th-place game

9th–12th playoffs

Classification 9–12

11th-place game

9th-place game

Final standings

Awards 

All-Tournament Team

 Léo Westermann
 Klemen Prepelič
 Edgaras Ulanovas
 Daniel Díez
 Rudy Gobert

References

External links
FIBA Europe

FIBA U20 European Championship
2012–13 in European basketball
2012–13 in Slovenian basketball
International youth basketball competitions hosted by Slovenia